Uzhhorod Port of Entry is a land border crossing between Ukraine and Slovakia on the Ukrainian side, near the city of Uzhhorod. The crossing is situated on autoroute /.

The port of entry is located within the city of Uzhhorod, which lies on the border with Slovakia. Across the border on the Slovakian side is the village of Vyšné Nemecké.  The Slovakian border crossing simultaneously serves as a crossing with the European Union (Schengen Area).

The type of crossing is automobile, status - international. The types of transportation for automobile crossings are passenger and freight.

The port of entry is part of the Uzhhorod customs post of Chop customs.

See also
 Slovakia–Ukraine border
 State Border of Ukraine
 Highway M08 (Ukraine)
 Uzhhorod Central Rail Terminal

External links
 State Border Guard of Ukraine website 

Uzhhorod
Slovakia–Ukraine border crossings
Transport in Uzhhorod